The Cougar is an American reality television series broadcast by TV Land. The series premiered on April 15, 2009, for an eight-episode run, and it concluded on June 3, 2009. Filmed in Los Angeles, California, the series followed Stacey Anderson, a 40-year-old cougar, in search for a partner among a group of 20 men, all of whom were in their 20s. The men were required to participate in a series of romantic challenges; Anderson assessed the men's performances and subjected the men to weekly elimination ceremonies. Whichever man remained at the end of the competition had the option of pursuing a long-term relationship with Anderson. The series was hosted by American actor Vivica A. Fox.

Overview
Over eight weekly hour-long episodes, the young men (all in their 20s) compete for a chance to have a long term relationship with Stacey Anderson, a 40-year-old real estate agent and divorced mother of four from Arizona. The show is very similar in format to The Bachelorette, except that instead of using roses to determine who stays and who goes, the Cougar uses the "Kiss Off".  During the Kiss Off, each contestant gives the Cougar a kiss and if she kisses on the lips, the contestant stays, but if she gives her cheek, the contestant is out.

The "Cubs"

Adam and Grant are twin brothers.
Travis, the youngest contestant, had his first legal adult beverage with the cougar.

The Kiss-Off

 The contestant won The Cougar.
 The contestant was eliminated during the regular Kiss-Off.
 The contestant was eliminated during his group date.
 The contestant withdrew from the competition.

1 The contestant won the Solo Date Challenge and went on a solo date with Stacey.
2 The contestant won the Group Date Challenge and went on a group date with Stacey.
3 In Episode 5, Stacey picked Adam and Travis for a date because she felt she was losing them. Adam and Travis did not win the challenge.
In Episode 7, Stacey had a solo date with all the remaining contestants.

Statistics

 The contestant won The Cougar.
 The contestant won the challenge and went on group date
 The contestant won the challenge and went on solo date
 The contestant was eliminated.
 The contestant won the challenge and was in the Bottom 2
 The contestant was in the Bottom 2
 The contestant won a group date but was eliminated.
 The contestant was eliminated during his group date.
 The contestant withdrew from the competition.

3 In Episode 5, Stacey picked Adam and Travis for a date because she felt she was losing them. Adam and Travis did not win the challenge.
In Episode 7, Stacey had a solo date with all the remaining contestants.

Episodes

Meet the Cougar

Solo Date Challenge: First Impressions
Challenge Winner: Travis
Eliminated: Kevin, Bodie, Brad, Rich
Quit: Grant

40 Years Young

Group Date Challenge: Designing Custom Workout Regimens
Challenge Winners: Adam, Colt, Ryan, Tom, Travis
Call-Out Order: Adam, Colt, Travis, Ryan
Eliminated: Tom
Solo Date Challenge: Giving Stacey a Birthday Gift
Challenge Winner: Jon
Eliminated: J.D., Jim

Men Vs Boys
Group Date Challenge: Talent Show
Winners: Adam, Johnny, Austin, David
Solo Date Challenge: Picking a Dress for Stacey
Winner: Joe
Eliminated: Johnny, Kai, and Nick

Truth and Consequences
Group Date Challenge: Revealing Secrets
Winners: Jon, Ryan
Eliminated: Ryan
Solo Date Challenge: Composing and Singing a song to Stacey
Winner: Colt
Eliminated: Austin, David

The Claws Come Out
Group Date Challenge: Kissing Stacey
Winners: Jimmy
Eliminated: Jon, Joe

Episode Notes
3 In Episode 5, Stacey picked Adam and Travis for a date because she felt she was losing them. Adam and Travis did not win the challenge.

Meet the Families
Travis' Family: Sister, Mother, Brother
Jimmy's Family: Mother, Father
Colt's Family: Brothers
Adam's Family: Twin Brother (Grant)
Eliminated: Adam

Vegas Nights
Jimmy's Date: Racecar Driving, Dinner, Overnight Stay
Travis' Date: Massage, Steam Shower, Dinner, Overnight Stay
Colt's Date: Helicopter Ride, Dinner, Overnight Stay
Eliminated: Travis

The Last Kiss?
Runner Up: Colt
Winner: Jimmy

References

External links
 
 Watch full episodes of The Cougar on TVLand.com
 

2009 American television series debuts
2009 American television series endings
2000s American reality television series
American dating and relationship reality television series
English-language television shows
TV Land original programming
Television series by Warner Horizon Television